UAE Exchange ( Markaz Al'Imarat Alearabiat Almutahidat Lilsarafa) is a United Arab Emirates based company dealing primarily in remittance, foreign exchange and bill payment services. The company is headquartered in Abu Dhabi, UAE, and operates through 800 locations across 31 countries either as UAE Exchange, or Unimoni.

The business has circa 9,000 employees across 40 countries. It is one of the largest remittance companies and has extensive network in the Middle East and Asia with particular emphasis on India where over 40% of its offices and staff are located.

International branding

During 2018, UAE Exchange began re-branding to "Unimoni" at locations outside of the United Arab Emirates. This initially started with its retail presence in India, Fiji, Canada and Australia. Markets such as Hong Kong and Tanzania, as well as further afield have also since been re-branded as Unimoni.

History
UAE Exchange established its first branch and operations in Abu Dhabi, UAE in the year 1980.

By 2014 It has around 800 branches in the world 
1993 saw UAE Exchange became a SWIFT member and over the following two years opened operations in Oman and Kuwait, as well as launching transfer, gold card and bank note services.

In 1999 it launched retail operations in India, which was to become the largest operation outside its home base, with 330 branches by 2015. It opened offices in Bangladesh, the United Kingdom and Sri Lanka over the following three years.

In 2001 it launched Xpress Money, a money transfer service in the UK. Xpress Money was later extracted into the wider group.

During 2003 the business added Australia to its network, it also launched services for the corporate (B2B) sector.

In 2004 it introduced online money transfers.

Between 2005 and 2009 it opened offices in Hong Kong, Uganda, Jordan, Canada, New Zealand and China, as well as purchasing MoneyDart Global Services in the United States. The business also launched an online money transfer brand, Money2anywhere.com. XPay; a mobile bill payment application was also purchased in India.

In 2009 it became an Authorised Payment Institution with the UK financial regulator Financial Services Authority (which later became the Financial Conduct Authority).

In October 2018, UAE Exchange partnered with telecommunications company Ooredoo.

In March 2019 Sudhir Shetty left the business. Prior to his role as president of the business which he had held since 1991, he had served as its chief operating officer.

Mid 2019 Finablr began co-branding businesses within its estate.

On 16 March 2020 UAE Exchange suspended all new transactions citing "certain operational challenges" in an emailed statement. Although the statement issued by the business fails to mention it directly, the challenges referenced likely pertain to the near-collapse of its parent Finablr earlier that same day.

On 16 March 2020, Finablr, of which UAE Exchange is a part, was suspended from the London Stock Exchange as it announced it was in danger of collapse having identified circa $100m (£81m) of undisclosed financing, which meant it no longer had any certainty over its financial position. Simultaneously, Promoth Manghat, Group CEO left the business. The business also stated that it was no longer able to provide certain payment processing services, however failed to address what services this entailed. Administrators Kroll were appointed to carry out an independent investigation into its finances.

On 17 March 2020, Finablr, of which UAE Exchange is a part, announced that it has engaged an accountancy firm to undertake rapid contingency planning for a potential insolvency appointment,

On 18 March 2020, Finablr, of which UAE Exchange is a part, announced that the division had been placed under supervision of the Central Bank of the UAE with immediate effect. The Central Bank of the UAE also stated that it had commenced an examination of UAE Exchange in order to verify its compliance with applicable laws and regulations.

During June 2020, Xpress Money, a group business, had its authorisation to operate withdrawn by the UK's Financial Conduct Authority.

In December 2020 UAE Exchange's parent group, Finablr was acquired by Prism Group AG and Royal Strategic Partners, the Abu Dhabi investment vehicle associated with Hazza bin Zayed bin Sultan Al Nahyan, brother of the Crown Prince of Abu Dhabi, Mohammed bin Zayed Al Nahyan. The consortium said that they planned to restructure the group to provide the subsidiaries, including UAE Exchange with working capital.

Subsidiaries

 UAE Exchange & Financial Services, in India with over 330 offices 
 UAE Exchange Australia Pty Ltd
 UAE Exchange Centre Bahrain Co WLL
 UAE Exchange Centre LLC, Liaison Office
 UAE Exchange Canada Pty Ltd
 UAE Exchange China Liaison Office 
 UAE Exchange Fiji Pty Ltd
 UAE Exchange Hong Kong Limited            
 UAE Exchange Centre LLC, Liaison Office, India
 UAE Exchange Centre LLC, Liaison Office, Indonesia
 Jordan UAE Exchange LLC Co
 Kuwait National Exchange Co
 UAE Exchange New Zealand Pty Ltd
 Oman & UAE Exchange Centre Co LLC
 UAE Exchange Centre LLC, Liaison Office, Pakistan
 UAE Exchange Centre LLC, Liaison Office, Philippines
 Qatar- UAE Exchange Establishment
 UAE Exchange Centre LLC, Liaison Office, Sri Lanka
 UAE Exchange Centre LLC, Sudan 
 UAE Exchange Uganda Limited 
 UAE Exchange Centre LLC, UAE
 UAE Exchange Centre LLC, UK
 MoneyDart Global Services, Inc, USA
 Nyuvo, India
 UAE Exchange & Finance Ltd, India
 XM Software Solutions private Ltd
 XM Services Ltd

References

Foreign exchange companies
Financial services companies of the United Arab Emirates
Banks established in 1980
Emirati companies established in 1980